The Australian Speedcar Championship is a dirt track motor racing championship held in Australia each year to determine the Australian national champion in midget car racing. The single championship meeting, run over two nights in either late January or early February, has been held each year since first being run at the Tracey's Speedway in Melbourne in 1935.

Over the years there have been at times more than one Australian Championship meeting held in Australia (and sometimes in the same city) due to being sanctioned by different governing bodies. There were also times during the 1950s and 1960s when several track promoters around the country staged meetings which they claimed were either an Australian Championship, or sometimes even a World Championship, usually in defiance of not being awarded the right to host the official championship.

While there have been drivers who have won more than one Australian Speedcar Championship, only three drivers have ever won both the national Speedcar championship and the Australian Sprintcar Championship. They are the George Tatnell from Sydney who won the Speedcar title in 1972–73, 1973–74 and 1976–77, plus the Sprintcar championship in 1987–88. Adelaide's Phil March won in his Nissan powered Speedcar in 1985–86, and also won the Sprintcar championship in 1998–99. The third driver was Sydney's Robbie Farr who won the 1997–98 Speedcar title and the 2003–04 Sprintcar championship.

Andy McGavin and Ray Revell from Sydney, and Adelaide's Harry Neale, with five championships each are the most successful drivers in the championships history (all won before 1964–65). Western Australia's Mike Figliomeni, Warrenne Ekins from Darwin and Adam Clarke from NSW have each won the event four times while five drivers have won the event three times. Eleven drivers from the United States have won the championship.

Australia's first Formula One World Champion Sir Jack Brabham was a four-time winner of the event, winning the championship in 1947–48, 1949 (twice), and 1952–53.

The oldest Australian champion was Bob Holt who won the 1998–99 title at the Northline Speedway in Darwin at the age of 58. Holt, originally from Sydney, began racing Speedcars in the early 1960s and was one of the leading competitors at the Sydney Showground during Australian speedway's "golden era".

Unlike other national championship meetings in Australian speedway racing, overseas drivers are permitted in the Australian Speedcar Championship. Seven winners of the title since 2002–03 have been Americans, with placings by New Zealanders also being recorded over a number of years.

The 2011–12 Australian Speedcar Championship was due to be held on 16–17 March 2012 at the Maryborough Speedway in Maryborough, Queensland. The meeting was cancelled due to inclement weather conditions caused by Cyclone Yasi.

The current (2019–2020) Australian Speedcar Champion is Lemoore, California (United States) driver Carson Macedo, who won the title at Premier Speedway in Warrnambool, Victoria.

Winners since 1965

** The championship was run as a national series between 1963/64 and 1971/72 (with the final round always held at the Sydney Showground), following which it reverted to a single championship meeting.## 1976–77 and 1979–80 Championships were run over three rounds at three different tracks with a pointscore deciding the winner♦ 2001–02 Championship was sanctioned by NASR and not Speedcars Australia as previous (and after)

1977–78 Controversy
The 1977/78 championship at the Brisbane Exhibition Ground remains controversial. In the feature race the field, led by defending champion George Tatnell who had built up almost half a lap lead, was under the yellow caution flags with 8 laps remaining due to a stalled car on the narrow track. With the restart imminent, officials erred by switching to the green light half a lap before the field reached the start line, catching out most of the field, including Tatnell. Local driver Ron Wanless powered past Tatnell and built up a winning lead before the Sydney-based driver could respond. Instead of calling for a restart as they should have, officials unbelievably allowed the race to finish, though Wanless was shown the "racing under protest" flag. Post-race Tatnell immediately protested, as did Adelaide driver Rex Hodgson who was third before the restart but was passed at the early green light by another local driver Danny Davidson. The officials failure to restart the race after the green light error led to conspiracy theories that as it was local Brisbane drivers who benefited (at the time, the local bodies assigned officials to national championship meetings), officials had no intention of admitting they were wrong, thus there was no intention of correcting the problem. There was also a theory that going green early was a common practice at the Exhibition Ground and that knowing the local drivers would be ready for it, the locally supplied officials gave the early green to give them an advantage in an effort to have a home town winner. After numerous protests and votes by committee's, Wanless was eventually awarded the win from Tatnell and Davidson.
If any body had bothered to read the ASCC rule book of the day the rule clearly said the race could and would be started after a stoppage when the track was clear which was agreed and affirmed at the drivers meeting before the event began, consequently Wanless was declared the winner by the ASCC (Australian Speedcar Control Council) affirming also that the Chief Steward made the correct decision.

See also

Motorsport in Australia

References

External links
Australian Speedcar Championship Honour Roll - Speedcars Australia

Auto races in Australia
Speedway in Australia
National championships in Australia
Midget car racing